Triple B may refer to:

Triple B Sides, an EP by The Adicts
5BBB, a radio station branded as Triple B FM
Big Baller Brand

See also
BBB (disambiguation)